The 2018 Juan Martín del Potro tennis season officially commenced on 10 January 2018 with the start of the Delray Beach Open. This season saw Del Potro slightly improve on his previous results as well as his playing style. Highlights from his season includes winning his 400th career match in Indian Wells, where he won the first Masters 1000 title of his career. After he was forced to retire due to a leg injury in the Italian Open, his participation in the French Open was apparently at risk. However, the Argentine managed to recover in time and entered the tournament as the fifth seed. There, he performed notably well considering the doubts surrounding his physical condition, and the fact that clay is not the best surface for his style of play. His run to the semi-finals ensured that, for the first time since February 2014, Delpo would return to his career-best ranking of world No. 4.

All matches
This table chronicles all the matches of Juan Martín del Potro in 2018, including walkovers (W/O) which the ATP does not count as wins.

Singles matches

Doubles matches

|}

Schedule

Singles schedule

Doubles schedule

Yearly records

ATP and Grand Slam sanctioned matches 
Juan Martín del Potro has a  ATP match win–loss record in the 2018 season. His record against players who were part of the ATP rankings Top Ten at the time of their meetings is 7–4. Bold indicates player was ranked top 10 at time of at least one meeting. The following list is ordered by number of wins:

  David Ferrer 3–0
  Karen Khachanov 3–0
  John Isner 2–1
  Damir Džumhur 2–0
  Filip Krajinović 2–0
  Albert Ramos Viñolas 2–0
  Milos Raonic 2–0
  Borna Ćorić 1–1
  Frances Tiafoe 1–1
  Kevin Anderson 1–0
  Julien Benneteau 1–0
  Jérémy Chardy 1–0
  Marin Čilić 1–0
  Alex de Minaur 1–0
  Roger Federer 1–0
  Richard Gasquet 1–0
  Egor Gerasimov 1–0
  Marcos Giron 1–0
  Peter Gojowczyk 1–0
  Robin Haase 1–0
  Chung Hyeon 1–0
  Philipp Kohlschreiber 1–0
  Denis Kudla 1–0
  Nick Kyrgios 1–0
  Feliciano López 1–0
  Nicolas Mahut 1–0
  Leonardo Mayer 1–0
  Kei Nishikori 1–0
  Benoît Paire 1–0
  Denis Shapovalov 1–0
  Gilles Simon 1–0
  Dominic Thiem 1–0
  Stefanos Tsitsipas 1–0
  Fernando Verdasco 1–0
  Donald Young 1–0
  Alexander Zverev 1–0
  Mischa Zverev 1–0
  Nikoloz Basilashvili 0–1
  Roberto Bautista Agut 0–1
  Tomáš Berdych 0–1
  Novak Djokovic 0–1
  Fabio Fognini 0–1
  Dušan Lajović 0–1
  Rafael Nadal 1–2
  David Goffin 0–2

Finals

Singles: 6 (2 titles, 4 runner-up)

Earnings
Bold font denotes tournament win

 Figures in United States dollars (USD) unless noted.

See also
 2018 ATP World Tour
 2018 Roger Federer tennis season
 2018 Rafael Nadal tennis season
 2018 Novak Djokovic tennis season

References

External links 
 ATP tour profile

Potro, Juan Martin del
2018 in Argentine tennis
2018 in Argentine sport